Servo bandwidth is the maximum trackable sinusoidal frequency of amplitude A, with tracking achieved at or before 10% of A amplitude is reached. The servo bandwidth indicates the capability of the servo to follow rapid changes in the commanded input. It is usually specified as a frequency in Hertz or radian/sec.

Explanation 

Bandwidth of systems is generally defined to be the frequency at which the system's amplitude is  times the signal amplitude. But if we apply same logic to servo systems it is difficult to analyze and develop a system to a sufficiently accurate specification.

A simple and sound definition can be sought regarding this.
Let us say we want to design a position servo control system with following specifications:
 Bandwidth:  10 Hz
 Allowed amplitude range : ± 50°

The above definition is not enough to design a practical control system. The definitions above have inherent problems with regard to what amplitude the manufacturer should take to design the servo with 10 Hz bandwidth.
If the manufacturer takes the amplitude to be ±20° and rise time for this amplitude to be 0.025 sec (10 Hz sinusoid)
and some other manufacturer takes amplitude to be ±50°, the acceleration requirements calculated by two will be very different.

This leads us to understand that giving servo bandwidth alone with no amplitude specification is almost useless.

See also 
 Servomechanism

References 

Wave mechanics
Control theory